Hugh Walton (born 30 May 1955) is a Canadian former cyclist. He competed in the team pursuit event at the 1976 Summer Olympics.

References

External links
 

1955 births
Living people
Canadian male cyclists
Olympic cyclists of Canada
Cyclists at the 1976 Summer Olympics
Sportspeople from Vancouver